The Junior Eurovision Song Contest 2007 was the fifth edition of the annual Junior Eurovision Song Contest. It was held in the Ahoy indoor sporting arena in Rotterdam, the Netherlands on 8 December. The host country was chosen by the European Broadcasting Union (EBU) on 13 July 2006 and the host city was announced on 11 September 2006. AVRO won the rights to host the show over Hrvatska radiotelevizija (HRT) of Croatia (who did not participate in this contest) and the Cyprus Broadcasting Corporation (CyBC) of Cyprus.

The budget for the contest was stated to be more than €2,000,000. Profits made from the televoting were donated to UNICEF.

The winning performer was Alexey Zhigalkovich, singing "S druz'yami" (With friends). This was Belarus' second win; they won for the first time in 2005.

Location

Bidding phase and host selection
AVRO were awarded the rights to host the contest in September 2006, with a budget of more than €2,000,000 being spent to stage the event.

Venue

The base of the present Ahoy was laid in 1950. After the devastation caused by the Second World War, the city of Rotterdam had worked on reconstruction and Rotterdam port was virtually complete. To mark the occasion, the Rotterdam Ahoy! exhibition was held in a purpose-built hall on the site where the medical faculty of the Erasmus University now stands.  The exhibition hall was called the Ahoy-Hal. The apostrophe is a remnant of the original exclamation mark. The hall was used for a series of national and international events, such as the exhibition of the architect Frank Lloyd Wright’s work. During the North Sea flood of 1953 the hall also proved its worth as a reception centre for victims. Rotterdam Ahoy, in its current form, was built in 1970. The complex’s striking design won various national and international awards for its special steel structures. The first event to be held there was the Femina family exhibition. Since then, Ahoy has been expanded on a number of occasions, and was renovated and refurbished in 1998 to create today’s multifunctional venue.

Format

Visual design
On 22 October 2007, the contest was officially presented to the media at a press conference where the first details regarding the show were confirmed. The theme for the contest was water and the motto was Make a big splash!. Five water curtains decorated the stage designed by Ronald van Bersselaar, which explained why this year’s logo featured the "singing girl" wearing boots.

Presenters
At the same press conference, Kim-Lian van der Meij was revealed to be the female host of the show, alongside Sipke Jan Bousema who was the previously announced as the male host.

Opening and interval acts
Dutch group Ch!pz performed during the interval alongside singer Katie Melua.

Participants
Patricia Goldsmith, Communications Adviser of the Eurovision TV department, stated that "19 countries will take part" in the Junior Eurovision Song Contest 2007, though Spanish broadcaster Radiotelevisión Española (RTVE) later announced its withdrawal from the contest. Croatian broadcaster HRT also withdrew due to expense and difficulties in broadcasting the contest live. Armenia, Bulgaria, Georgia and Lithuania were the newcomers this year. Bosnia and Herzegovina was going to be one of the four débutants but Georgia took this place when Radiotelevizija Bosne i Hercegovine (BHRT) decided to withdraw from participation. The minimum age of contestants was raised from 8 to 10 years this year.

The Swedish representative, Frida Sandén, was a backing singer for her sister Molly who represented Sweden in 2006.

Participants and results

Detailed voting results

12 points
Below is a summary of all 12 points received. All countries were given 12 points at the start of voting to ensure that no country finished with nul points.

Spokespersons 
Viewers from each participating country voted by telephone and SMS.  Each country's awards points to their top-10 favourites based on these public voting results.  The following spokespersons announced the point 1 to 8, 10, and the maximum 12 points.

 Nino Epremidze 
 Bab Buelens
 Ani Sahakyan
 Natalie Michael
 Clara Pedro
 Marina Knyazeva
 Iulia Ciobanu
 Lyubomir Hadjiyski
 Anđelija Erić
 Kimberly Nieuwenhuizen
 Mila Zafirović
 Assol
 Molly Sandén
 Sophie DeBattista
 Chloe Sofia Boleti
 Indre Grikstelyte
 Alexander Rogachevskiy

Broadcasts 

Most countries sent commentators to Rotterdam or commentated from their own country, in order to add insight to the participants and, if necessary, provide voting information. A live webcast was also streamed via the Junior Eurovision official website.

Official merchandise

Junior 07 Eurovision Song Contest, is a compilation album put together by the European Broadcasting Union, and was released by Universal Music Group in November 2007. The album features all the songs from the 2007 contest, along with karaoke versions.

An official double CD of the Junior Eurovision Song Contest 2007 was intended to go on sale on 23 December 2007. There was no official DVD of the contest due to a lack of interest. The Belgian single was released on 5 October 2007, while the Dutch entry went on sale on 26 October 2007. There are no plans for commercial single releases of JESC entries in other countries, but a few promo copies for Rotterdam might be printed.

See also
 Eurovision Song Contest 2007
 Eurovision Dance Contest 2007

Notes

References

External links
 

 
2007
2007 in the Netherlands
Eurovision Song Contest 2007
Events in Rotterdam
2007 song contests
December 2007 events in Europe